Katya Reimann (born 1965) is an American writer of fantasy novels.

Biography 
Reimann is an author of high fantasy novels. Her debut novel, Wind from a Foreign Sky, is set in a world similar to the Dark Ages. She has cited her literary influences as T. H. White, 18th century writers, and Rene Goscinny.

Reimann has a PhD in 18th Century Literature from the University of Oxford, which she achieved in 1995 after six years of study and teaching in England. She also has a bachelor's degree from Yale University.

She lives in St. Paul, Minnesota.

Bibliography

The Tielmaran Chronicles 
 Wind From a Foreign Sky  (1996)
 A Tremor in the Bitter Earth (1998) 
 Prince of Fire and Ashes (2002)

Rulers of Hylor
Upon the death of Cherry Wilder, Reimann completed the final book in the series:
 The Wanderer (2004)

Nominations and awards
 John W. Campbell Award for Best New Writer (1997, nominated)

References

External links 
 Official website (archived)
 
 Bibliography at SciFan
 A Review of Wind from a Foreign Sky at FantasyLiterature.net

1965 births
Living people
20th-century American novelists
21st-century American novelists
American fantasy writers
American women novelists
Women science fiction and fantasy writers
20th-century American women writers
21st-century American women writers